Pablo de Torres (born 14 April 1984) is an Argentinean sprint canoer. Between 2007 and 2015 he won five medals at the Pan American Games in two-man (K-2) and four man (K-4) events. He competed in the K-4 1000 m event at the 2016 Summer Olympics, but failed to reach the final.

Torres has a degree from the University of Buenos Aires and works as an instructor at a kayak school in San Fernando. He has one son.

References

1984 births
Living people
Canoeists at the 2016 Summer Olympics
Olympic canoeists of Argentina
Argentine male canoeists
Pan American Games medalists in canoeing
Pan American Games silver medalists for Argentina
Pan American Games bronze medalists for Argentina
Canoeists at the 2015 Pan American Games
South American Games gold medalists for Argentina
South American Games silver medalists for Argentina
South American Games medalists in canoeing
Competitors at the 2010 South American Games
Medalists at the 2015 Pan American Games
21st-century Argentine people